Abdulrahman Kamel Abdullah Al-Ghamdi (born 1 November 1994) is a Saudi football player who plays as a forward.

International career
Al-Ghamdi was called up to the senior Saudi Arabia squad for a 2018 FIFA World Cup qualifier against United Arab Emirates in March 2016.

Honours
Al-Ittihad
Winner
 King Cup of Champions: 2013

Runners-up
 Saudi Super Cup: 2013

References

External links

1994 births
Living people
Saudi Arabian footballers
Saudi Arabia youth international footballers
Saudi Arabia international footballers
Ittihad FC players
Al-Raed FC players
Saudi Professional League players
Association football forwards